Khariton Platonovich Platonov (1842, Vorona, Mologsky Uyezd, Yaroslavl Governorate, Russian Empire - 18 September 1907, Kiev, Russian Empire (now Kyiv, Ukraine)) was a Russian Imperial genre painter and art professor who spent most of his career in Kiev. A majority of his works feature young women as their subjects.

Biography 
He was born to a peasant family. From 1859 to 1870, he attended the Imperial Academy of Arts where he was awarded silver medals for "success in drawing" in 1862, 1863 and 1867. Upon graduating, he was given the title of "Artist", third degree, and became a lecturer at a district school in Tsarskoye Selo. After presenting two works at the Academy's exhibition in 1872, he was promoted to Artist, second degree.

In 1878, for his painting "Bulgarian Boy", he received a gold medal from the Academy's council. In 1883, he became an Artist of the first degree and, in 1893 was named an "Academician". In 1889, his painting "The Little Jewish Girl" was purchased by Finance Minister Ivan Vyshnegradsky

After 1877, he was a resident of Kiev, where he taught at the Kiev Drawing School; founded in 1875 by Nikolay Murashko. From 1884 to 1889, he worked on the mural restoration project at St. Cyril's Church, under the direction of Mikhail Vrubel. In 1901, he helped reorganize the drawing school and broaden its curriculum to become the "Kiev Art School".

He had major showings at the 31st and 32nd exhibitions of the Peredvizhniki and exhibited widely throughout Russia.

Works

References

External links 

1842 births
1907 deaths
People from Mologsky Uyezd
19th-century painters from the Russian Empire
Russian male painters
Russian genre painters
Peredvizhniki
19th-century male artists from the Russian Empire